Oscar Piantoni (1949 – 20 June 2018) was an Italian professional football manager.

Career 
Piantoni was born in 1949 in Gandino, in the Province of Bergamo, Italy. He most notably coached Alzano Virescit from 1993 to 1997 between the Serie D and the Serie C1, and was AlbinoLeffe's first head coach between 1998 and 2001, helping them to promotion to the Serie C1.

Piantoni also coached Alessandria, Monza, Valenzana, Caravaggese and Pergocrema in Italy. He moved to Romania; initially Walter Zenga's assistant at Naţional București, Piantoni then took charge of Divizia B side Liberty Oradea in 2005–06, helping them to promotion to the Divizia A.

Personal life 
Piantoni had a sister, Laura. He and his wife, Raffaella, had two daughters: Alessia and Rossana.

On 20 June 2018, Piantoni died aged 69 at the Papa Giovanni XXIII hospital of Bergamo.

References

1949 births
2018 deaths
Sportspeople from the Province of Bergamo
Italian football managers
Virtus Bergamo Alzano Seriate 1909 managers
U.S. Darfo Boario S.S.D. managers
F.C. Lumezzane V.G.Z. A.S.D. managers
U.C. AlbinoLeffe managers
A.C. Monza managers
CF Liberty Oradea managers
Valenzana Mado managers
U.S.D. Caravaggio managers
U.S. Pergolettese 1932 managers
Serie D managers
Serie C managers
Liga II managers
Italian expatriate football managers
Italian expatriate sportspeople in Romania
Expatriate footballers in Romania